Mercury granulomas is the result of mercury exposure, a skin condition characterized by foreign-body giant cell reaction.

See also 
 Granuloma
 Skin lesion

References 

Skin conditions resulting from physical factors